Mara Gercik Haseltine (born 22 February 1971) is an American artist and environmental activist who has shown and worked internationally. She collaborates with scientists and engineers to create her work, which focuses on the link between human's shared cultural and biological evolution.

Early life and family 
Her father is an American geneticist Dr. William A. Haseltine, a Professor of biochemistry at Harvard University.

Career 
Haseltine has worked internationally and collaborated with scientists and engineers to focus on the link between human's shared cultural and biological evolution.

Artist 
Haseltine worked for feminist French-American artist Niki de Saint Phalle and created mosaics in Normandy and France. She has built the 'Waltz of the Polypeptides,' 'SARS Inhibited.'

Environmental activist 
She is the Art Director of Geotherapy Art Institute Associates.

Recognition 
Haseltine has featured in the film 'Invisible Ocean: Plankton & Plastic' to reveal a microscopic threat found beneath the ocean. She has been featured in the book 'Confronting Morality with Science and Art,' written by Pascale Pollier-Green.

.

References 

1971 births
Living people
20th-century American women artists
21st-century American women artists
Oberlin College alumni
Mixed-media artists
Artists from Cambridge, Massachusetts
BioArt
Environmental artists
American environmentalists